The 2017 Missouri State Bears football team represented Missouri State University in the 2017 NCAA Division I FCS football season. They were led by third-year head coach Dave Steckel and played their home games at the Robert W. Plaster Stadium. They were a member of the Missouri Valley Football Conference. They finished the season 3–8, 2–6 in MVFC play to finish in a tie for eighth place.

Schedule

Game summaries

at Missouri

at North Dakota

Murray State

Illinois State

at North Dakota State

at Western Illinois

South Dakota State

Indiana State

at Southern Illinois

Northern Iowa

at Youngstown State

References

Missouri State
Missouri State Bears football seasons
Missouri State Bears football